Oskowo is a non-operational PKP railway station in Oskowo (Pomeranian Voivodeship), Poland.

Lines crossing the station

References 
Oskowo article at Polish Stations Database, URL accessed at 27 March 2006

Railway stations in Pomeranian Voivodeship
Disused railway stations in Pomeranian Voivodeship
Lębork County